Ascaptesyle submarginata is a moth of the subfamily Arctiinae. It was described by William Schaus in 1905. It is found in Trinidad. No subspecies are listed in the Catalogue of Life.

References

Moths described in 1905
Lithosiini
Moths of the Caribbean